Toshimi (written: ,  or ) is a masculine Japanese given name. Notable people with the name include:

, Japanese footballer
, Japanese politician
, Japanese samurai and daimyō
Toshimi Tagawa, Japanese Enka singer

Japanese masculine given names